Eugene Township is one of five townships in Vermillion County, in the U.S. state of Indiana.  As of the 2010 census, its population was 2,025 and it contained 901 housing units.

Geography

Cities
 Cayuga

Unincorporated towns
 Eugene at 
(This list is based on USGS data and may include former settlements.)

Cemeteries
The township contains five cemeteries: Brown, Eugene, Groenendyke, Isle and Patrick.

Landmarks
 County Fairgrounds
 The Eugene Covered Bridge was listed on the National Register of Historic Places in 1994.

School districts
 North Vermillion Community School Corporation

Political districts
 Indiana's 8th congressional district
 State House District 42
 State Senate District 38

References
 U.S. Board on Geographic Names (GNIS)
 United States Census Bureau 2007 TIGER/Line Shapefiles

External links
 Indiana Township Association
 United Township Association of Indiana

Townships in Vermillion County, Indiana
Townships in Indiana